"Pray Anything" is the tenth episode of the fourteenth season of the American animated television series The Simpsons. It originally aired on the Fox network in the United States on February 9, 2003. In the episode, Homer sues the church and ends up receiving the deed to own it. Under his ownership, the church becomes a hangout for townspeople.

Plot
At a WNBA game which the Simpson family are attending, the announcer offers a $50,000 prize for successfully shooting a half-court basket. Ned Flanders kneels and prays before shooting the basket, and makes it. He declares he will donate the money, much to Homer's dismay, which is then doubled to $100,000 by the Rich Texan. After Ned's car is blocked from leaving the parking lot, Homer witnesses the Flanders family being allowed to drive a Hot-Dog-mobile home instead. The following day, Homer asks Ned what his secret is, and Ned replies it is hard work, clean living, and prayer; since the first two would require effort on his part, Homer focuses on prayer, which he believes to work after achieving minor feats such as finding the remote control and creating a new snack (fudge-covered bacon).

After noticing his excessive praying, Marge tells Homer that he should not ask God to do everything for him, which he bluntly refuses to consider. On a Sunday, Homer is walking towards the church and prays to God for a better house. Not looking where he is going, he falls into a shallow hole. A lawyer convinces Homer to sue the church. In court, the jury finds in Homer's favor and he receives the deed to the church, after Reverend Lovejoy admits he cannot pay the original sum of $1 million. Despite Marge's objections, he moves the family there and throws a house warming party. Meanwhile, Lovejoy sets up a temporary congregation at Barney's Bowlarama, but the sermon is a disaster, and a disheartened Lovejoy leaves Springfield, much to Ned's dismay.

Homer's party goes on for several days and the church becomes a bar and hangout for the townspeople, and Ned observes that they have violated all Ten Commandments. As Marge worries that Homer is incurring God's wrath, a rainstorm begins and Homer is struck by lightning in the mouth (God's way of smiting him for his blasphemy, sacrilege and heresy). The town begins to flood, and the townspeople flee to the roof of the church. Just as the townspeople are about to cannibalize Homer, Reverend Lovejoy returns in a helicopter and leads everyone in prayer, asking God to forgive them. The flood subsides, and afterwards Lisa gives logical reasons for the cause of the events that had happened, with the storm and flood caused by bonfire and trees being cut down, but when questioned about why the rain suddenly stopped, Lisa just says "I don't know. Buddha?". The camera then pans to God, Buddha and Colonel Sanders watching from Heaven, rationalizing that the humans have suffered enough, with God asking for Colonel Sanders' popcorn chicken.

Production
The show has delved into religious themes many times in its history. In this episode, the theme of prayer is given center stage.

The episode had a freelance pitch. O'Neal and Boushell wanted to ensure they came up with a unique idea that had never been done before, as they knew they were approaching the show's 300th episode. The original pitch was based on an NPR story about the "gospel of prosperity". This episode opens with a WNBA game because many NBA players had turned them down for a guest spot a couple of years before in the episode "Children of a Lesser Clod". The lenticular card of a "vengeful god" and "loving god" was animated by creating two images which cross dissolved with white lines interspersed. Al Jean explained that a valid point made in the episode was why God should care about the average man's first world problems when there are natural and man-made disasters that could use his help. Castellaneta did a longer falling noise at the table read than the one that appeared in the final cut of the episode. Jean explained that due to the loss of Phil Hartman – and therefore Lionel Hutz – it was tough to introduce new lawyers to the show. This episode includes one such attempt. The staff had a fight with the broadcast standards over Homer dancing around the church in his underwear. In regard to the sunset shot, up until this point in the show's history, there was not much graduated shading used because it had to be painstakingly drawn. In contrast, it is very quick and easy using computers, which is why Polcino prefers digital over the hand painted; many more color and shading options are made available.

Reception
The Orlando Sentinels Gregory Hardy named it the thirteenth best episode of the show with a sports theme. 

Polcino said Pray Anything was a "well-written show", and "one of his favorite scripts" as he loves addressing religious themes.

Cultural references
The episode title is a reference to the movie "Say Anything...".

References

External links

The Simpsons (season 14) episodes
2003 American television episodes